Kubra or Kübra may refer to:

Given name
Kübra is a Turkish feminine given name.
 Hatice Kübra İlgün (born 1994), Turkish taekwondo practitioner
 Hatice Kübra Yangın (born 1989), Turkish taekwondo practitioner
 Kübra Berber (born 1996), Turkish footballer
 Kübra Kuş (born 1994), Turkish water polo player
 Kübra Öçsoy (born 1994), Turkish Paralympian table tennis player
 Kübra Öztürk (born 1991), Turkish Woman Grand Master chess player
 Kubra Sait, Indian actress
 Kübra Siyahdemir (born 1986), Turkish basketball player
 Kübra Yılmaz (born 1991), Turkish handball player

Surname
 Najmuddin Kubra, Iranian Sufi

Places
 Kubra, Republic of Dagestan, a rural locality in Dagestan, Russia
 Nowa Kubra, a village in north-eastern Poland
 Stara Kubra, a Polish village

Turkish feminine given names